Eight ships of the Royal Navy have borne the name HMS Espiegle

 was a 16-gun French brig-sloop, launched at Bayonne in 1788.  and  captured her off Ushant on 30 November 1793. She was sold in 1802.
 was a French 12-gun aviso launched in 1793 at Saint-Malo.  captured her in the Antilles on 16 March 1794. She was commissioned under Lieutenant John Fishley. The Navy sold her in 1800.
 was a 16-gun sloop, formerly the civilian vessel Wimbury (or Wembury), launched at Barnstaple in 1803. The Admiralty purchased her in 1804 and sold her in 1811 for breaking up.
 was an 18-gun  launched in 1812 and sold in 1832.
 was a 12-gun brig launched in 1844 and sold in 1861.
 was a  composite screw sloop launched in 1880. She became a boom vessel in 1899, was renamed HMS Argo in 1904 and was sold in 1921.
 was a  launched in 1900 and sold in 1923.
 was an  launched in 1942 and broken up in 1967.

A gun-boat named Espiegle served in the navy's Egyptian campaign between 8 March and 2 September 1801. Her officers and crew qualified for the clasp "Egypt" to the Naval General Service Medal, which the Admiralty issued in 1847 to all surviving claimants.

Notes, citations, and references
Notes

Citations

References

 
  
 

Royal Navy ship names